Kattula Kondaiah is a 1985 Telugu-language action film, produced by Kella Rama Swamy in the banner of Prasanna Arts and directed by S. B. Chakravarthy. It stars Nandamuri Balakrishna, Sumalatha , and music scored by Chakravarthy. Satyanand penned the dialogues and wrote the screenplay for the story by S. B. Chakravarthy.

Plot
The film begins with frightful ruffian Kattula Kondaiah one that is employed by two direful, MLA Madhava Rao and his brother-in-law Prasad Rao who conspires against one another. Exploiting it, Kattula Kondaiah seeks his vengeance when he is rearwards. In reality, he is Kiran a virtuous scaredy-cat journalist but he strives to elicit the unjust in society. He loves a plucky girl Jyoti daughter of Madhava Rao. Inspector Vijay brother of Jyoti promises to knit them. In tandem, Madhava Rao & Prasad Rao undertakes an indictable offense as justness which is triggered by Kiran. Hence, they strike him when he is saved by a stranger Narayana a convict acquitted from jail. Narayana realizes Kiran is the son of his friend Dharma Rao and turns him into a valorous. Just then, his mother Annapurna divulges Narayana as the homicide of her husband. 

Thus, Kiran onslaughts on him, when Narayana reveals the fact. Dharma Rao is the rectitude and the two share beyond the relationship of friends. Once, Dharma wins a lottery for which their common friend Madhava Rao complots with Prasad Rao and slaughtered him. Further, they penalized Narayana. Hearing it, Kiran burns for avenge. Meanwhile, Vijay seals the illegal activities of Prasad Rao even though Madhava Rao also backstabs him. So, begrudged Prasad Rao poisons, Vijay. Besides, Kiran pulls the car break to kill Madhava Rao. Tragically, Vijay takes up the vehicle and dies due to poison making an accident. Now Kiran repents considering himself as the culprit, confesses his sin to Jyoti, and surrenders to Police. During this plight, Narayana breaks out the truth when Kiran absconds from prison and is transformed into Kattula Kondaiah. At last, with the support of Narayana and Jyoti Kiran proves as guiltless and sentences the knaves. Finally, the movie ends on a happy note with the marriage of Kiran & Jyoti.

Cast

Nandamuri Balakrishna as Kiran
Sumalatha as Jyothi
Satyanarayana as Narayana 
Rajendra Prasad as Inspector Vijay 
Gummadi as Dharma Rao
Gollapudi Maruti Rao as MLA Madhava Rao
Nutan Prasad as Prasad Rao
Bhima Raju as Bheemudu
Narra Venkateswara Rao as Doctor
Hema Chandra as Jailor
KK Sarma as Editor 
Chidatala Appa Rao as Chemcha
Silk Smitha as Item Number
Subha as Annapurna
Jaya Vijaya as Madhava Rao's wife
Vanaja 
Lalitha Mani

Soundtrack

Music composed by Chakravarthy. Lyrics were written by Veturi. Music released on AVM Audio Company.

References

1985 films
Films scored by K. Chakravarthy
1980s Telugu-language films